Rani Shiromani was the queen of Karnagarh, during the British rule in India. She was a valiant leader of peasants who rebelled against the British East India Company. she played a major role in the Chuar rebellion in Midnapore. She created the first revolt against the British through the farmers in Midnapore. She was against the British East India Company and refused to pay taxes. Thus, she was called as the Rani Laxmi Bai of Midnapore.

Karnagarh Raj 
According to Binoy Ghosh, the kings of Karnagarh ruled over a zamindari that included Midnapore and the surrounding areas. The  Sadgop  dynasty that ruled over Karnagarh included Raja Lakshman Singh (1568-1661), Raja Shyam Singh (1661-1668), Raja Chhotu Roy (1667), Raja Raghunath Roy (1671-1693), Raja Ram Singh (1693-1711), Raja Jaswant Singh (1711-1749), Raja Ajit Singh (1749) and Rani Shiromani (1756-1812). They had a close relationship with the rulers of Narajole.

The last king of Karnagarh, Raja Ajit Singh, had two queens, Rani Bhabani Singh and Rani Shiromani Singh. Raja Ajit Singh died childless in 1760 and his property went into the hands of his two queens. Rani Shiromani had ruled the land with an able hand after her husband's death. Rani Bhabani died in 1754 and Rani Shiromani died in 1812.

Chuar rebellion 
The Chuar rebellion, a series of peasant rebellions between 1769 and 1809 by the inhabitants of the countryside surrounding the West Bengali settlements of Midnapore, Bankura and Manbhum against the rule of the East India Company (EIC). In 1760s, the British East India Company was awarded the Diwani or rights to land of Bengal, Bihar and Orissa by the Mughal rulers of Delhi. This led to the raising of land taxes many times. This caused many, including some small landlords and peasants, to lose their land and property to the company. Thus, rebels rose in revolt against the exploitative land revenue policies of the EIC, which threatened their economic livelihoods. In 1799, Rani Shiromani led the revolt against the British administration and tax collectors in Midnapore. Rani led the band of peasants into a guerilla war against the British Company. The Karnagarh temple was the hotspot of the Chuars during the Chuar movement. However, she was captured and imprisoned for 13 years at Abasgarh fort in Midnapore until her death in 1812. She was kept in solitary confinement at Hijli prison, now called as Shaheed Bhawan, IIT Kharagpur. She was the India's first lady prisoner for leading the Chuar Rebellion as early as the 1790s.

Amongst the many dispossessed Bhumij zamindars, those who lent support to the rebels included royalties such as, Jagannath Singh of Dhalbhum, Subal Singh of Kuilapal, Shyam Ganjam Singh of Dhadka, Durjan Singh of Raipur,  Baidyanath Singh of Dhalbhum, Mangal Singh of Panchet, Ganga Narayan Singh of Birbhum, Dubraj Singh of Birbhum, Raghunath Singh of Dhalbhum, Raja Madhu Singh of Manbhum,  Raja Mohan Singh of Juriah, Lakshman Singh of Dulma, Sunder Narayan Singh and Fateh Singh.

Honours 
The Indian Railways has introduced the Howrah-Adra Shiromani fast passenger train to commemorate the title of the Rani Shiromani.

See also 
 Karnagarh
 Chuar rebellion
 Raghunath Singh
 Durjan Singh
 Ganga Narayan Singh

References 

1812 deaths
Bengal Presidency
History of Jharkhand
Tribal chiefs
Indian revolutionaries
Adivasi
Bhumij people
Adivasi women
Indian independence activists from West Bengal